Iton 77 is an Israeli monthly literature and culture magazine published in Israel.

History and profile
Iton 77 was established by the poet and editor Jacob Besser in 1977. The magazine also owns a small publishing company under the same name, which mostly publishes volumes of poetry.

See also 
List of literary magazines

References

External links
 Official Site (in Hebrew)
 Iton 77 on the University of Texas at Austin Libraries digital repository.

1977 establishments in Israel
Literary magazines published in Israel
Magazines established in 1977
Monthly magazines
Poetry literary magazines